Werner Kruger (born 23 January 1985 in Kempton Park, South Africa) is a former rugby union player who played at prop. Kruger was part of the Bulls team that won both the 2009 and 2010 Super 14 finals. He played for the Blue Bulls in the Currie Cup and has represented South Africa at under 21 level. He won the Pro12 with the Scarlets in the 2016/2017 season against Munster Rugby.

In August 2015, Kruger became the first player to have played in 100 Super Rugby matches for the Bulls, as well as 100 Currie Cup matches for the Blue Bulls.

Kruger signed a contract to join Welsh Pro12 side Scarlets on a three-year deal prior to the 2016–2017 season. Kruger played in the Dublin final vs Munster, the Scarlets won to be crowned 2016–17 Pro12 champions.

On 1 February 2021, Kruger announced his retirement from the competition at the end of the 2020-21 season.

References

External links
Bulls profile

itsrugby.co.uk profile

1985 births
Living people
People from Kempton Park, Gauteng
South African rugby union players
South Africa international rugby union players
Bulls (rugby union) players
Blue Bulls players
Rugby union props
Afrikaner people
Rugby union players from Gauteng
Scarlets players